The knockout stage of the 2007 Sudirman Cup was the final stage of the competition, following the group stage, held from 14 to 17 June 2007.

Qualified teams

Brackets

Level 1

Level 2

Level 3

Level 4

Level 5

Level 6

Classification round

Forty-seventh place match: Latvia vs. Cyprus

Forty-fifth place match: Turkey vs. Iceland

Forty-third place match: Slovakia vs. Belarus

Forty-first place match: Portugal vs. Belgium

Thirty-ninth place match: Luxembourg vs. Norway

Thirty-seventh place match: South Africa vs. Peru

Thirty-fifth place match: Slovenia vs. Sri Lanka

Thirty-third place match: Lithuania vs. Ireland

Thirty-first place match: Spain vs. Estonia

Twenty-ninth place match: Wales vs. Switzerland

Twenty-seventh place match: Italy vs. Bulgaria

Twenty-fifth place match: Australia vs. Czech Republic

Twenty-third place match: Ukraine vs. Finland

Twenty-first place match: Canada vs. New Zealand

Nineteenth place match: United States vs. Scotland

Seventeenth place match: France vs. India

Fifteenth place match: Sweden vs. Russia

Thirteenth place match: Germany vs. Netherlands

Eleventh place match: Chinese Taipei vs. Poland

Ninth place match: Singapore vs. Japan

Seventh place match: Thailand vs. Hong Kong

Fifth place match: Malaysia vs. Denmark

Semi-finals

China vs. South Korea

England vs. Indonesia

Final

China vs. Indonesia

References

External links 
 

2007 Sudirman Cup
Sudirman Cup knockout stage